Sideroxylon st-johnianum is a species of plant in the family Sapotaceae. It is endemic to Henderson Island, Pitcairn. Having been described first as Nesoluma st-johnianum (1938), this species was transferred to the genus Sideroxylon in 2007 as a result of the phylogenetic analyses.

References

Flora of the Pitcairn Islands
stjohnianum
Vulnerable plants
Taxonomy articles created by Polbot
Taxobox binomials not recognized by IUCN